Afrikaner-Jews (also called Boerejode) are Jewish Afrikaners. At the beginning of the 19th century, when greater freedom of religious practice was permitted in South Africa, small numbers of Ashkenazi Jews arrived from Britain and Germany. They established the first Ashkenazi Hebrew congregation in 1841. Between the end of the 19th century and 1930, large numbers of Jews began to arrive from Lithuania and Latvia. Their culture and contribution changed the character of the South African community.

According to the South African Jewish Museum, "Many of the later immigrants arrived with no resources other than their wits and experience. Most could not speak English when they arrived. Often they would learn Afrikaans before English. Their households were often multi-lingual, with parents speaking Yiddish and Afrikaans, and the children learning English at school."

Notable Afrikaner-Jews
Olga Kirsch, was a noted Afrikaans author and poet.
Pieter-Dirk Uys, is a South African satirist, active as a performer, author, and social activist.
Joel Stransky, rugby player.
Adam Friedland, stand-up comedian, sketch comedian, and podcaster

See also
 South African Jews

References

External links
 http://www.sajewishmuseum.co.za/
 https://web.archive.org/web/20151104221240/http://oldwww.lib.uct.ac.za/jewish/duker-collections/

Afrikaner Jews
Ashkenazi Jewish culture in South Africa
 
Ethnic groups in South Africa
Jews and Judaism in South Africa